This list of Uruguayan physicians includes notable physicians and surgeons, medical scientists and medical doctors from Uruguay or its territory and of Uruguayan descent. Physicians of all specialities may be listed here.

B

Jorge Basso
José Bayardi
Eduardo Blanco Acevedo

C

Roberto Caldeyro-Barcia
Ángel Canaveris
Roberto Canessa
Santiago Chalar

D

José L. Duomarco

F

Orestes Fiandra

G

Javier García Duchini
Juan Gutiérrez Moreno (physician)

L

Luis Morquio
Arturo Lussich

M

Louis Antony Micheloni
Susana Muñiz
María Julia Muñoz

N

Alfredo Navarro

O

Emilio Oribe

P

Carlos Pita (politician)

R

Elías Regules
Vladimir Roslik

T

Rodolfo Tálice

V

Tabaré Vázquez
Hugo Villar

X

Mónica Xavier

Z

Walter Zimmer

 
Uruguay
Physicians